Waterton Lakes National Park is a national park located in the southwest corner of Alberta, Canada. It borders Glacier National Park in Montana, United States. Waterton was the fourth Canadian national park, formed in 1895 and named after Waterton Lake, in turn after the Victorian naturalist and conservationist Charles Waterton. Its range is between the Rocky Mountains and prairies. This park contains  of rugged mountains and wilderness.

Operated by Parks Canada, Waterton is open all year, but the main tourist season is during July and August. The only commercial facilities available within the park are located at the Waterton Park townsite. It offers many scenic trails, including Crypt Lake trail. In 2012/2013, Waterton Lakes National Park had 402,542 visitors.

The park was the subject of a short film in 2011's National Parks Project, directed by Peter Lynch and scored by Cadence Weapon, Laura Barrett and Mark Hamilton.

History
William Pearce, a Dominion Land Surveyor was the first to suggest a park be established in the vicinity of Waterton Lakes in his 1886 annual report, although no action was taken by the government. In 1893, Frederick William Godsal, a rancher who resided north of the lakes wrote Pearce referencing his 1886 report and suggested the area be turned into a park reserve, Pearce forwarded the proposal, noting the land had no value for agricultural and minimal grazing potential. Minister of the Interior Thomas Mayne Daly came across the proposal and directed a park reserve be created in the area. Finally on May 30, 1895, Order-in-Council 1895-1621 established a  unnamed forest park under the Dominion Lands Act.

While oil had been found in the area since the late 1880s, the government began approving reservation and sales of land for prospecting in 1898. In 1901, John Lineham of Okotoks organized the Rocky Mountain Drilling Company. In 1902 he drilled the first oil exploration well in Alberta on the site of oil seeps near Cameron Creek. Despite a small recovery of 34° API sweet oil, neither this well nor seven later exploration attempts resulted in production. The oil well and surrounding area was designated a National Historic Site of Canada in 1965. By 1905 more than half of the sections of land compromising the park had been sold or reserved for oil exploration. On September 21, 1905, Frederick William Godsal wrote the Secretary of the Interior requesting he consider expanding the park reserve for scenic and recreational purposes. The Dominion Forest Reserves Act which came into force in 1906 established the Kootenay Lakes Forest Reserve under the authority of the Superintendent of Forestry.

In 1911 Minister of the Interior Frank Oliver introduced the Dominion Forest Reserves and Parks Act which designated all existing mountain parks, Elk Island and Buffalo Parks into forest reserves, with the authority to designate all or part of the reserve a "Dominion Park" (later National Park).

In 1920 William Thomson, the designer and head professional of the original golf course in Banff National Park was brought to Waterton to design a nine-hole golf course. A clubhouse would be constructed in 1928 and the course was expanded to 18 holes between 1931 and 1936. Further renovations to the course in the 1950s were designed by golf course architect Stanley Thompson.

Prince of Wales Hotel

The Prince of Wales Hotel, one of Canada's grand railway hotels, was constructed between 1926 and 1927 adjacent to Upper Waterton Lakes, by the Great Northern Railway of the United States in an attempt to lure American tourists during the U.S. prohibition era. The hotel which opened in July 1927 is the only grand railway hotel in Canada to be constructed by an American railway company. The hotel was named after the Prince of Wales (later King Edward VIII), in a transparent attempt to entice him to stay in the hotel on his 1927 Canadian tour, but the prince stayed at his own nearby ranch in Pekisko, Alberta instead. The hotel was designated as a National Historic Site of Canada on 6 November 1992.

Later history
In 1932, Waterton-Glacier International Peace Park was formed from Waterton Lakes National Park and Glacier. It was dedicated to world peace by Sir Charles Arthur Mander on behalf of Rotary International on 18 June 1932, whose members from the Alberta and Montana chapters lobbied for the formation of the park. The Peace Park was the first of its nature in the world, and was intended to promote goodwill between nations and underscore the international nature of protection of wilderness.

In terms of local governance, those lands within Waterton Lakes National Park were split between the Municipal District of Kerr No. 39 and the Municipal District of Castle River No. 40 prior to 1944. Following a partial amalgamation of the two municipal districts, remnant unsurveyed lands within the park were incorporated as Improvement District (ID) No. 11 on January 1, 1944. It was renumbered to ID No. 8 on April 1, 1945, and again to ID No. 4 on January 1, 1969.

The Waterton-Glacier International was inscribed a UNESCO World Heritage Site in 1995. In 1979, Waterton became Canada's second biosphere reserve and the first Canadian national park to take part in this UNESCO program. Biosphere Reserves are created to achieve a better understanding of the relationship between humans and the natural environment.

In September 2017, a large forest fire forced the evacuation of the townsite and park. The fire burned through 200 km2 of the park, destroying the visitor centre, stables and other buildings. Some 80% of hiking trails were affected and several remained closed for the 2018 season.

Geology
The oldest rocks in the park are marine sediments dating back 1.5 billion years. These rocks are composed of limestone, dolomite and igneous rocks. There are fossilized sea beds as well as salt pseudomorph. There are numerous stromatolite formations that are 1.3 billion years old.

Unlike the Canadian Rockies, whose sedimentary strata are more or less inclined, the Waterton sediments are characterized by a single overlap. The Lewis Overthrust allowed sediment Proterozoic to move as a unit, more or less, horizontally on the rocks of the Cretaceous period dating from about 70 million years ago on a remote 100 km south-east of the mountain's present location. The fact that older rocks end up on younger rocks is a rare occurrence in geology. Under the Proterozoic layer, there is a layer dating from the Upper Cretaceous which is mainly composed of schist.

Although there are no glaciers left in Waterton, aside from a few expanses of eternal snow, the landscape has been greatly shaped by the Wisconsin glaciation. The park has many glacial troughs, the hanging valleys, the ridge, the cirque, the kame and esker. Since the end of the last ice age, the Cameron and Blakiston rivers have formed two alluvial fans at their mouths.

Ecology 

Waterton Lakes National Park spans four ecoregions, foothills parkland, montane, subalpine and alpine. Waterton is the only National Park in Canada with the foothills parkland ecoregion, which comprises approximately 10 percent of the Park and occupies a narrow band along the eastern edge of the foothills of Alberta from Calgary to Waterton and into parts of the United States.

Flora 
There are over 1000 species of vascular plants found in the park. Over 20 species are endemic to the park such as Lewis' mock-orange and white-veined wintergreen. Over 50 species of plants that are found the park are rare in Canada such as Bolander's quillwort, Lyall's scorpionweed, and Brewer's monkeyflower. Waterton Lakes National Park is also home to small ferns called moonworts and the Waterton moonwort is endemic to the park.

Fauna 
Animals that inhabit this national park include wolverines, bighorn sheep, bald eagles, white-tailed deer, mule deer, mountain goats, elk, moose, foxes, timber wolves, bison, coyotes, beavers, river otters, cougars, lynxes, bobcats, snowshoe hares, pikas, hoary marmots, grizzly bears and black bears. Many bird species nest or migrate through the park, some of which include bald eagles, Canada geese, orange-crowned warblers, and MacGillivray's warblers.

Climate
Waterton Lakes National Park Cameron Falls weather station has a humid continental climate (Koppen: Dfb), bordering relatively closely on a subarctic climate (Dfc). Summertime is mild with cool nights, while winter is chilly with highs around freezing. Snowfall is heavy, averaging 481.5 cm (189.6 inches).

Biosphere Reserve

In 1979, Waterton and bordering Glacier National park in the US were designated as World Biosphere reserves, preserving mountains, prairie, lakes and freshwater wetlands ecosystems. Habitats represented in the parks' range include: prairie grasslands, aspen grove forests, alpine tundra/high meadows, lower subalpine forests, deciduous and coniferous forests.

World Heritage Site

The park is part of the Waterton-Glacier International Peace Park, designated as World Heritage Site in 1995 for their distinctive climate, physiographic setting, mountain-prairie interface, and tri-ocean hydrographical divide. They are areas of significant scenic values with abundant and diverse flora and fauna.

Photo gallery

See also

Kootenay National Park
 List of National Parks of Canada
 List of mountains of Alberta
 List of protected areas of Alberta
 List of trails in Alberta
 List of waterfalls of Alberta

References

External links

 Waterton Lakes National Park (Parks Canada)
 
 Pure Experience: Waterton Lakes National Park (Travel Alberta)

 
World Heritage Sites in Canada
Biosphere reserves of Canada
National parks of the Rocky Mountains
Protected areas established in 1895
1895 establishments in Alberta